Minuscule 516 (in the Gregory-Aland numbering), ε 144 (in the Soden numbering), is a Greek minuscule manuscript of the New Testament, on parchment. Palaeographically it has been assigned to the 11th century. Scrivener labelled it with the number 502. It was adapted for liturgical use.

Description 

The codex contains the complete text of the four Gospels on 287 parchment leaves (size ) with only one lacunae (Matthew 16:2-17). The text is written in one column per page, 23 lines per page, in a small and elegant hand.

There is also a division according to the Ammonian Sections, with references to the Eusebian Canons.

Text 

The Greek text of the codex is a representative of the Byzantine text-type. Hermann von Soden included it to the textual family Kx. Aland placed it in Category V.

According to the Claremont Profile Method it represents textual family Kx in Luke 1 and Luke 20. In Luke 10 no profile was made. It was corrected by later hand to Kr (subgroup 35).

History 

It is dated by the INTF to the 11th century.

In 1727 the manuscript came from Constantinople to England and was presented to archbishop of Canterbury, William Wake, together with the manuscripts 73, 74, 506-520. Wake presented it to the Christ Church College in Oxford.

The manuscript was added to the list of New Testament minuscule manuscripts by F. H. A. Scrivener (502) and C. R. Gregory (516). Gregory saw it in 1883.

It is currently housed at the Christ Church (Wake 32) in Oxford.

See also 

 List of New Testament minuscules
 Biblical manuscript
 Textual criticism

References

Further reading

External links 

 

Greek New Testament minuscules
11th-century biblical manuscripts